Paul Quessenberry (born January 8, 1992) is an American football tight end who is a free agent. He played college football at Navy.

Career

Military 
After earning a Bachelor of Science degree in general science from the United States Naval Academy, Quessenberry served for five years as a rifle platoon and weapons platoon commander in the United States Marine Corps. He also served as deputy director of the 1st Marine Division school.

New England Patriots
Quessenberry signed with the Patriots on August 22, 2020, after serving five years in the Marine Corps. He was released on September 4, signed with the New England practice squad on September  6, and was released on September 9, 2020.

Houston Texans
Quessenberry signed with the Texans on February 8, 2021, to a one year contract. He was waived on August 31. Quessenberry was later signed to the practice squad. He made his NFL debut in week 16 against the Los Angeles Chargers, appearing on 18 snaps in the 41–29 win. He signed a reserve/future contract with the Texans on January 11, 2022.

On August 30, 2022, Quessenberry was waived by the Texans and re-signed to the practice squad. He was released on September 7.

Personal life 
Quessenberry's brothers both play in the NFL. His younger brother, Scott Quessenberry, was the 155th overall pick in the fifth round of the 2018 NFL Draft by the Los Angeles Chargers. His older brother, David Quessenberry, was drafted in the sixth round as the 176th overall pick in the 2013 NFL Draft by the Houston Texans.

References

External links
Navy Midshipmen bio

1992 births
American football tight ends
Houston Texans players
Living people
Military personnel from California
Navy Midshipmen football players
New England Patriots players
People from La Jolla, San Diego
Players of American football from San Diego
Sportspeople from Carlsbad, California